Paranomada is a genus of cuckoo bees in the family Apidae. There are at least three described species in Paranomada.

Species
These three species belong to the genus Paranomada:
 Paranomada californica Linsley, 1945
 Paranomada nitida Linsley & Michener, 1937
 Paranomada velutina Linsley, 1939

References

Further reading

External links

 

Nomadinae
Articles created by Qbugbot